Partizansky District is an administrative and municipal district (raion), one of the twenty-two in Primorsky Krai, Russia. It is located in the south of the krai and borders with Chuguyevsky District in the north and northeast, Lazovsky District in the east, the territory of Nakhodka City Under Krai Jurisdiction and the Sea of Japan in the south, the territory of Partizansk Town Under Krai Jurisdiction and Shkotovsky District in the west, and with Anuchinsky District in the northwest and north. Its administrative center is the rural locality (a selo) of Vladimiro-Alexandrovskoye. Population:  The population of Vladimiro-Alexandrovskoye accounts for 18.9% of the district's total population.

Geography
The territory of the Partizanskaya River basin is one of the warmest valleys in the Russian Far East.

History
The district was established in 1932.

References

Notes

Sources

Districts of Primorsky Krai